Kristen Rohlfs (13 May 1930 in Humptrup – 10 December 2017)  was a professor for astrophysics. He taught astronomy at the University of Bochum from 1974 to 1995.

Literature 
 Tools of Radio Astronomy. 1986

References

1930 births
2017 deaths
20th-century German astronomers
Academic staff of Ruhr University Bochum
People from Nordfriesland